Bumbuli is one of the 11 districts of Tanga Region in Tanzania. The district is bordered to the north the Lushoto District and is surrounded on three sides in the south by Korogwe District. It was split from Lushoto District in 2013.

Administrative subdivisions
As of 2016, Bumbuli District was administratively divided into 18 wards.

Wards

References

Sources

Districts of Tanga Region